Karate at the 2022 World Games – Qualification This article details the qualifying phase for karate at the 2022 World Games. 96 quota places for the Games are entitled to the karatekas coming from their respective NOCs, based on the results at designated tournaments supervised by World Karate Federation. Each NOC could enter a maximum of eight karatekas (one in each division) of twelve event categories. Host nation United States of America has reserved a spot in each of all  events.

Qualifying System
The rule that a country can only have one competitor per category prevails throughout the
qualification process.

First qualification
3 Place per Category: Gold, Silver and the Bronze medal winner of the Senior World Championships 2021 at Dubai

Second qualification
3 Place per Category: Three first positions in the World Karate Federation Ranking as per 1 March 2022.

Third qualification
1 Place per Category: The person from the host country United States of America with the highest World Ranking as per
1 March 2022.

Fourth qualification
1 Place per Category:The remaining total of 12 places are distributed by continental federation
in the following sequence based on their World Ranking as per 1 March 2022.

 2 Athletes from the OKF (1 Male and 1 Female)
 2 Athletes from the UFAK (1 Male and 1 Female)
 2 Athletes from the PKF (1 Male and 1 Female)
 1 Athletes from the AKF (1 Male or 1 Female)
 1 Athletes from the EKF (1 Male or 1 Female), If pick 4 is male the pick 5 must be female and vice versa
 2 Athletes from the UFAK (1 Male and 1 Female), Cannot be from the same countries as pick 2
 2 Athletes from the PKF (1 Male and 1 Female), Cannot be from the same countries as pick 3

Qualification summary
The following table summarises the outcome of qualification for the Karate at the 2022 World Games. Following athletes gained at least one quota place for Birmingham.

Men's events

Women's events

References

External links
 The World Games 2022
 World Karate Federation

Karate at the 2022 World Games